Following Sea is the seventh studio album by Belgian rock band Deus. It was released on 1 June 2012 by Play It Again Sam. The band's previous album, Keep You Close, was released less than a year previously, making this an uncharacteristically quick release.

Track listing

Charts

Weekly charts

Year-end charts

Certifications

References

2012 albums
Deus (band) albums
PIAS Recordings albums